The Internal iliac vessels are
 Internal iliac artery
 Internal iliac vein